Rangpur (pron: ˈræŋpʊə or ˈræŋgpʊə), 4th capital of the Ahom kingdom, was established by  Swargadeo Rudra Singha in 'Meteka' in 1707 after shifting the capital from Garhgaon  . It is currently a part of Sibsagar town. The place holds many monuments build by the Ahom dynasty, the most notable of which are the Talatal Ghar and the Rang Ghar.

The architectural plan of Rangpur spread over almost a thousand bighas of land. Ghanasyam, an architect from Koch Bihar, was deputed by Rudra Singha.

Rangpur means the' city of delight' and in Ahom language it is called Che-mun

Capital

Capital city
The city of Rangpur was laid in 1698 A.D. by Rudra Singha in Meteka area.
It had three gates  Borduar (i.e. main entrance), Na-duar and Paniduar besides an underground tunnel connected with the Dikhow river on the north. Rudra Singha's successors did much for the enhancement 
of splendour and expansion of the city of Rangpur. Ruchinath Kandali, a court poet of Rudra Singha, in his Markendaya Chandi states: "that king Rudra singha who founded the city of Rangpur brought many learned Brahmans from various places to his capital and established them there by giving jobs and land."

Dikhow River on the north of the town. On south a fort (Garh) near Namdang river, Baangarh on the east and Dikhow-Namdang on the west. Rudra Singha at first established the capital of his Kingdom  at Tengabari of Meteka area, and excavated the famous Joysagar Tank and there he constructed the Talatal Ghar, Rangnath Dol, Fakuwa dol and the Temples on the bank of Joysagar tanks. Siva Singha built five royal buildings. 

Pramatta Singha later built the Rang Ghar with bricks on the west of Talatal Ghar. Rajeswar Singha later also enlarged and re-constructed the Talatal Ghar with bricks. Lakshmi Singha made a flower garden in which he built the temple of Ekaneswar (siva) with a tank. It remained as dual capital of the Ahoms along with Garhgaon until the internal disturbances occurred in 1787 A.D.

In the reign of Sulikphaa (Ratnadhwaj Singha), he had temporarily established the capital at Meteka, and named it Rajnagar.

Roads and Communications
The main road of the capital was Borali, starting from Dergaon to Joysagar. Some other significant roads of around Rangpur were Meteka ali, Duboroni ali, Borpatra ali etc.

The royal families and the officials used to reside in the -Jerenga pothar, Rupohi pothar etc.

Decline 
Rangpur remained the capital during the most glorious period of the Ahom kingdom. The capital fell twice to rebels of the Moamoria rebellion for which it made it deserted. In the first instance, the rebels occupied the capital from November, 1769 to  April, 1770, when the Swargadeo, Lakshmi Singha (Sunyeophaa), was kept in captivity in Joy dol till the rebels were defeated by the royalist. In the second instance, the rebels occupied the capital in 1788 during the reign of Gaurinath Singha and held on to it till 1792, when Thomas Welsh of the East India Company removed them. Kamaleswar Singha made some efforts to revive its former glory but Burmese invasions left it a ruined city.

Photo gallery

See also
 Garhgaon

Notes and references

 Citations

 

Capitals of Ahom kingdom
Former capital cities in India
Sivasagar
1707 establishments in India
Buildings and structures completed in 1707
Ahom kingdom
Buildings and structures in Assam
Sivasagar district